N. Nanmaran (1946/1947 – 28 October 2021) was an Indian politician and Member of the Legislative Assembly of Tamil Nadu. He was elected to the Tamil Nadu legislative assembly as a Communist Party of India (Marxist) candidate from Madurai East constituency in 2001 election.

References 

1940s births
2021 deaths
People from Madurai
Communist Party of India (Marxist) politicians from Tamil Nadu
Year of birth missing